Madeleine Bochatay (born 2 January 1944) is a French alpine skier. She competed in two events at the 1964 Winter Olympics.

References

1944 births
Living people
People from Saint-Gervais, Isère
French female alpine skiers
Olympic alpine skiers of France
Alpine skiers at the 1964 Winter Olympics
Sportspeople from Isère